Comegys is a surname. Notable people with the surname include:

Celeste Comegys Peardon (1898–1988), American writer, educator
Cornelius P. Comegys (1780–1851), American farmer and politician
Dallas Comegys (born 1964), American basketball player
Joseph P. Comegys (1813–1893), American judge, lawyer and politician
Zelina Brunschwig (died 1981), American textile importer, born Zelina Comegys

See also
Rick Comegy (born 1953), American football player and coach